A by-election was held in the federal riding of Mississauga—Lakeshore in Ontario on December 12, 2022, following the resignation of incumbent Liberal MP Sven Spengemann. After 6 years in Parliament, Spengemann resigned on May 27, 2022, to accept a role with the United Nations. The election was won by former Ontario finance minister Charles Sousa.

Background

Constituency 

Mississauga—Lakeshore includes the Mississauga neighbourhoods of Clarkson, Lakeview, Lorne Park, Mineola, Port Credit, Sheridan, Sheridan Park, Southdown and parts of Erindale and Cooksville.

Conservative support is centred in the central part of the riding, particularly in the upscale Lorne Park and Mineola areas, while the Liberals tend to do better along the waterfront of the riding, such as Port Credit and Lakeview, and the eastern and western edges of the riding in neighbourhoods like Clarkson and Sheridan.

Representation 
The riding has been continuously represented by Liberals since 1993, except from between 2011 and 2015 when the riding was held by the Conservatives. Despite its recent history as a Liberal riding, the Liberals have rarely won the riding by large margins since the merger of the Conservative Party in 2003. Starting in 2015, as a part of the overall Liberal dominance of Greater Toronto Area seats and ridings, the riding has gone and stayed Liberal. Incumbent Sven Spengemann successfully defeated Conservative Stella Ambler in 2015 and 2019 and Conservative challenger Michael Ras in the 2021 snap election.

Campaign 
The Speaker's warrant regarding the vacancy was received on May 30, 2022; under the Parliament of Canada Act the writ for a by-election had to be dropped no later than November 26, 2022, 180 days after the Chief Electoral Officer was officially notified of the vacancy via a warrant issued by the Speaker. Under the Canada Elections Act, the minimum length of a campaign is 36 days between dropping the writ and election day.

Candidates
Running for the Liberals is former MPP Charles Sousa, who represented the area provincially from 2007 to 2018 and previously served in the provincial cabinets of Dalton McGuinty and Kathleen Wynne, including as Minister of Finance from 2013 to 2018. Alex Crombie, a former Queen's Park staffer and son of Mississauga mayor Bonnie Crombie, was seen as a potential candidate prior to Sousa's nomination.

Running for the Conservatives is Ron Chhinzer, a police officer of 20 years. As a police officer, Chhinzer was a founding member of the Toronto Police Service's Integrated Gang Prevention Task Force, which was involved in implementing the city's gang exit strategy. Former Conservative candidate Michael Ras, who finished second to Spengemann in 2021, considered running for the nomination before declining on social media.

The NDP has nominated Julia Kole, who ran for the seat's provincial counterpart in the provincial election earlier in the year. Julia previously worked as a Constituency Assistant for an MPP in Brampton. She holds a BA in accounting and an MSc in Environmental Policy and Management.

Running for the Green Party is Mary Kidnew, the founder of the Mississauga-Lakeshore Green Party Electoral District Association (EDA), known community advocate and a past president of the Hillcrest Ratepayers Association.

The People's Party nominated Khaled Al-Sudani as their candidate.

Rhinoceros Party leader Sébastien CoRhino will contest the by-election.

The Longest Ballot Committee organized a protest against the Trudeau government's abandonment of electoral reform in 2017 by running thirty-three independent candidates, breaking their own record for most candidates nominated in a single riding in Canada, previously set in the riding of Saint Boniface—Saint Vital in the 2021 Canadian federal election.

Polling

Results

2021 result

References 

Mississauga-Lakeshore federal by-election
Mississauga-Lakeshore federal by-election
Politics of Mississauga
Mississauga-Lakeshore
December 2022 events in Canada